The Law of the Sea is a 1931 American pre-Code drama film directed by Otto Brower, and starring William Farnum, Sally Blane and Rex Bell, as well as Priscilla Dean in one of her last films. Produced by Chadwick Pictures and originally distributed through Monogram Pictures, the film has had several video releases such as on VHS from Grapevine.

Cast
 William Farnum as Captain Len Andrews 
 Sally Blane as Betty Merton 
 Rex Bell as Cole Andrews 
 Priscilla Dean as Jane Andrews 
 Ralph Ince as Marty Drake 
 Eve Southern as Estelle 
 Wally Albright as Cole Andrews-as a child 
 Jack Rube Clifford as First Mate (unbilled)
 Heinie Conklin - Fireman (unbilled)
 Kit Guard - Seaman (unbilled)
 Jack Roper - Seaman (unbilled)
 Syd Saylor - Sailor (unbilled)

References

Bibliography
 Monaco, James. The Encyclopedia of Film. Perigee Books, 1991.

External links

allmovie/synopsis; Law of the Sea
Law of the Sea available for free download at Internet Archive

1931 films
1931 drama films
American drama films
Films directed by Otto Brower
Monogram Pictures films
American black-and-white films
Films based on short fiction
1930s English-language films
1930s American films